William Montacute or William de Montacute may refer to:

William de Montacute, 2nd Baron Montacute (c. 1285–1319)
William Montacute, 1st Earl of Salisbury (1301–1344)
William Montacute, 2nd Earl of Salisbury (1328–1397)

See also
William Montagu (disambiguation)

fr:William Montagu